Ottar Brox (born 30 August 1932 in Torsken) is a Norwegian authority in social science and a politician for the Socialist Left Party. He was professor of sociology at the University of Tromsø from 1972 to 1984, and later associate professor while working as head of research at the Norwegian Institute for Urban and Regional Research.

Brox graduated as an agronomist from Norwegian College of Agriculture (NLH) in 1957, took history and sociology at the University of Oslo in 1959 and 1960 and a Doctor of Science degree from NLH in 1970.

Brox was a member of parliament for Troms in the period 1973–1977. He was not re-elected in 1977. On the local level he has been a member of Bergen city council 1971–1972 and Oslo city council 1991–1995.

Brox has written a wide range of popularized science literature and participated actively in the public debate. Brox' most influential book is Hva skjer i Nord-Norge?, published in 1966. This book became a source of inspiration to Northern Norwegian regionalism and caused an upgrading of the economic impact of small vessels in fisheries. The theme of this book was carried on in Nord-Norge: Fra allmenning til koloni. His 1964 article "Avvisning av storsamfunnet som økonomisk tilpasningsform" (Rejection of Mainstream Society as a Form of Economic Adjustment) was selected for the Norwegian Sociology Canon in 2009–2011.

He is a member of the Norwegian Academy of Science and Letters.
In 2002 he received the Fritt Ord Honorary Award.
He holds an honorary doctorate at the Memorial University of Newfoundland since 1994, the University of Aberdeen since 2001 and the University of Tromsø since 2003.

References

1932 births
Living people
People from Torsken
Members of the Storting
Socialist Left Party (Norway) politicians
Troms politicians
Norwegian sociologists
University of Oslo alumni
Norwegian College of Agriculture alumni
Academic staff of the University of Tromsø
Members of the Norwegian Academy of Science and Letters
20th-century Norwegian politicians